The 11th FAMAS Awards Night was presented by the Filipino Academy of Movie Arts and Sciences on April 14, 1963 honoring the outstanding achievements of Filipino films for the year 1962.

El filibusterismo is a film adaptation of Jose Rizal's novel of the same name, and was made by the same company who made the film Noli Me Tángere. It won the FAMAS Award for Best Picture and another FAMAS for Best Director to Gerardo de León.

Awards

Major awards
Winners are listed first and highlighted with boldface.

References

External links
FAMAS Awards 

FAMAS Award
FAMAS
FAMAS